PPKM College, Mananthavady is a technical campus of Mananthavady town in Wayanad District, India.

Courses Offered
 M.Sc. in Electronics
 B.Sc. in Electronics
 B.Sc. in Computer Science
 B.Com.

History
The college was started in 2008 and it is affiliated to the Kannur University.

References

Universities and colleges in Wayanad district
Colleges affiliated to Kannur University
Mananthavady Area